Degema is a Local Government Area in Rivers State, Nigeria. Its headquarters are in the town of Degema.

Degema is situated in Rivers state in the South-South geo-political zone of Nigeria and has its headquarters in the town of Degema. The population of Degema local government area is estimated at 138,941 inhabitants with the majority of the people residing there being members of the Degema and Ijaw tribal divisions. The Ijaw and Degema dialects are widely spoken in the area while Christianity is the common religion practiced  in the area. Degema is home to a number of festivals which include the Agiri and Igugule festivals while the popular landmarks in the area include the Degema General Hospital,Medium Security Custodial Center, Degema, Zonal Hospital Degema, RT Hon. Tonye E. Harry Stadium. It has an area of 1,011 km and a population of 249,773 at the 2006 census.

The postal code of the area is 504.

List of communities and towns in Degema LGA 
The towns and villages that make up Degema LGA includes Degema, Bakana, Usokun-Degema, Ogurama, Tombia, Ke, Bille, Obuama and Bukuma.

References

Local Government Areas in Rivers State
Populated coastal places in Rivers State
1967 establishments in Nigeria
1960s establishments in Rivers State